William Jones  (1868–1953) was a Reform Party Member of Parliament in New Zealand.

He won the Northland electorate of Marsden in the 1925 general election, defeating Alfred Murdoch, but was defeated by Murdoch in the next general election in 1928.

In the 1946 New Year Honours Jones was appointed a Member of the Order of the British Empire in recognition of his services as mayor of Whangarei and chairman of the Provincial Patriotic Council in that region.

References

1868 births
1953 deaths
Members of the New Zealand House of Representatives
New Zealand Members of the Order of the British Empire
New Zealand MPs for North Island electorates
Reform Party (New Zealand) MPs
Unsuccessful candidates in the 1922 New Zealand general election
Unsuccessful candidates in the 1928 New Zealand general election
Mayors of places in the Northland Region